Maritza Olivares is a Mexican actress. She appeared in telenovelas and movies, for example in horror El Retorno de Walpurgis. Olivares’ best known role is the role of Cayetana in Entre el amor y el odio.

Olivares studied in London and has worked in Mexico, United States and France.
 
Olivares was nominated for an Ariel Award for Best Actress for her work in her first movie Los Meses y los Días, for which she also won the Heraldo Award. Olivares lost the Ariel to Lucha Villa, her co-star in the film National Mechanics.

Olivares has a daughter Valentina Sumavsky, also an actress.

Filmography

References

External links 

Maritza Olivares

Mexican film actresses
Mexican telenovela actresses
1956 births
Living people